Viðar Ari Jónsson (born 10 March 1994) is an Icelandic professional footballer who plays for Hungarian club Budapest Honvéd as a right midfielder,.

Career
Viðar, who began his career with Þróttur Reykjavík and spent 7 years with Fjölnir, signed for Eliteserien club Brann on 6 March 2017.

On 18 January 2019, Jónsson signed with Sandefjord for three years.

On 15 February 2022, Viðar Ari signed a 1.5-year contract with Budapest Honvéd in Hungary.

International career
Viðar has been involved with the U-19 and U-21 teams, and made his senior team debut against Chile at the 2017 China Cup.

Career statistics

Club

References

External links

Jónsson, Vidar Ari
Jónsson, Vidar Ari
Icelandic footballers
Jónsson, Vidar Ari
Iceland youth international footballers
Iceland under-21 international footballers
Iceland international footballers
Icelandic expatriate footballers
Úrvalsdeild karla (football) players
Jónsson, Vidar Ari
Jónsson, Vidar Ari
Icelandic expatriate sportspeople in Norway
Icelandic expatriate sportspeople in Hungary
Jónsson, Vidar Ari
Sandefjord Fotball players
Jónsson, Vidar Ari
Jónsson, Vidar Ari
Jónsson, Vidar Ari